The 1981 CONCACAF Champions' Cup was the 17th edition of the annual international club football competition held in the CONCACAF region (North America, Central America and the Caribbean), the CONCACAF Champions' Cup. It determined that year's club champion of association football in the CONCACAF region and was played from 26 April 1980 till 2 February 1981.

The teams were split in 2 zones, North/Central American and Caribbean, (as North and Central American sections combined to qualify one team for the final), each one qualifying the winner to the final tournament. All the matches in the tournament were played under the home/away match system.

Surinamean team Transvaal won the two-legged series v Salvadorean Atlético Marte (21 on aggregate), becoming CONCACAF champions for the second time in their history.

North/Central American Zone

First round

Atlético Marte, Marathón, UANL Tigres AND Cruz Azul advance to the second round.

Second round

Atlético Marte and Marathón advance to the third round.

Third round

Marathón withdrew
Atlético Marte advances to the CONCACAF Champions' Cup Final.

 Marathon 1-0 Atletico Marte (Celso Güity)

Caribbean Zone

First round

 

Transvaal vs. Defence Force and Yama Sun Oil vs. Saint Thomas College, Results are unknown.***
SUBT, Robinhood, Transvaal and Yama Sun Oil advance to the second round.

Second round

Robinhood vs. Transvaal, Results are unknown.***
SUBT and Transvaal advance to the third round.

Third round

Transvaal advances to the CONCACAF Champions' Cup Final.

Final

First leg

Second leg 

Transvaal won 2–1 on aggregate.

Champion

References

1
CONCACAF Champions' Cup